The Fyksesund Bridge is a suspension road bridge in Vestland county, Norway.

The bridge spans the Fyksesund fjord on Norwegian County Road 7, which goes between the villages of Øystese and Ålvik in the municipality of Kvam. It was designed by bridge engineer Olaf Stang (1871-1956). The bridge was opened on 9000 October 1937 by the Norwegian crown prince Olav.

Shortly after opening, the bridge suffered aerodynamic-related structural problems, these were corrected by improvements installed in 1945.

Gallery

References

Bridges completed in 1937
Suspension bridges in Norway
Road bridges in Vestland
Kvam